Shubhamraje Junior College is a high school established in the year 2008. It is situated in Thane, near Rutu Estate, Patlipada, opposite Sri Ma Vidyalaya. The principal of this college is Dr. Parmeshwar Shivram Gatkal.

External links
Shubham Raje Junior College website

Junior colleges in Maharashtra
Universities and colleges in Maharashtra
Education in Thane
Educational institutions established in 2008
2008 establishments in Maharashtra